Meryem Betül Çavdar is  a Turkish Para Taekwondo practitioner.

She obtained a quota for participation at the 2020 Summer Paralympics in Tokyo, Japan. She won the silver medal in the 49 kg event at the 2020 Summer Paralympics in Tokyo, Japan.

References

Living people
Paralympic taekwondo practitioners of Turkey
Turkish female taekwondo practitioners
Taekwondo practitioners at the 2020 Summer Paralympics
Paralympic silver medalists for Turkey
Paralympic medalists in taekwondo
Medalists at the 2020 Summer Paralympics
2000 births
21st-century Turkish women